The Alberta–British Columbia foothills forests are a temperate coniferous forests ecoregion of Western Canada, as defined by the World Wildlife Fund (WWF) categorization system. This ecoregion borders Canada's taiga and contains a mix of subarctic forest and temperate forest species as a result. This makes the region an ecotone region, or a region that acts as a buffer between two other biomes.

Setting
This ecoregion covers two separate areas: the rolling foothills of the Rocky Mountains of Alberta and further west a smaller area of the hills and valleys of central British Columbia. The Clear Hills in the north of the region are steeper.

Flora
The forests are a mixture dominated by lodgepole pine (Pinus contorta), jack pine (Pinus banksiana), trembling aspen (Populus tremuloides), black spruce (Picea mariana), and white spruce (Picea glauca). Other trees include balsam poplar (populus balsamifera), paper birch (Betula papyrifera) and balsam fir (Abies balsamifera).

Fauna
These foothills are home to the largest populations of moose (Alces alces) in North America. Other mammals include snowshoe hare (Lepus americanus), beaver (Castor canadensis), muskrat (Ondatra zibethica), wolf (Canis lupus) and two subspecies of black bear the cinnamon bear (Ursus americanus cinnamomum) of the Rocky Mountains and the eastern black bear (Ursus americanus americanus) of the Canadian Taiga.

Birds of the area include sandhill cranes (Grus canadensis), ruffed grouse (Bonasa umbellus), spruce grouse (Falcipennis canadensis) and large numbers of waterbirds and New World warblers (Parulidae).

Threats and preservation
These forests have been extensively altered by human activity, especially clearance for planting.

See also
 List of ecoregions in Canada (WWF)

References 

Temperate coniferous forests
Ecozones and ecoregions of Alberta
Ecozones and ecoregions of British Columbia
Forests of Alberta
Forests of British Columbia
Forests of the Rocky Mountains
Nearctic ecoregions